The Diocese of Oea (Latin: Dioecesis Oëensis) is a suppressed and titular See of the Roman Catholic Church.

History 

Oea, corresponding to the city of Tripoli in present-day Libya, is an ancient episcopal seat of the Roman province of Africa Nova, Tripolitania.

The diocese is still mentioned in the Notitiae Episcopatuum written by the Byzantine emperor Leo VI the Wise. (886-912)

Bishops

 Natal † (cited in  256)
 Marinianus † (cited in 411) (donatist bishop)  
 Saint Cresconius † (before 467 - after 484)

Titular bishops  
 Bernardo Maria Beamonte, O.C.D. † (1728 - 1733)
 Francesco di Ottaiano, O.F.M. † (1735 - ?)
 Alessandro Grossi † (1876 - 1889)
 Luigi Giuseppe Lasagna, S.D.B. † (1893 - 1895)
 Jean-Baptiste Grosgeorge, M.E.P. † (1896 - 1902)
 Francesco Bacchini † (1905 - 1908)
 Vittore Maria Corvaia, O.S.B. † (1908 - 1913)
 Salvatore Ballo Guercio † (1920 - 1933 appointed bishop of Mazara del Vallo)
 Camille Verfaillie, S.C.I. † (1934 - 1980)
 Michel Louis Coloni † (11 May 1982 - 30 January 1989, appointed archbishop of Dijon)  
 Michel Marie Jacques Dubost, C.I.M. (9 August 1989 - 7 March 1998)
 David Kamau Ng'ang'a, from 22 December 1999

References

Bibliography
 Pius Bonifacius Gams, Series episcoporum Ecclesiae Catholicae, Leipzig, 1931, p. 467
 Stefano Antonio Morcelli, Africa christiana, Volume I, Brescia, 1816, pp. 249–250
 Konrad Eubel, Hierarchia Catholica Medii Aevi, vol. 5, p. 295; vol. 6, p. 316
 Joseph Mesnage, L'Afrique chrétienne, Paris, 1912, p. 164

Catholic titular sees in Africa
Roman towns and cities in Africa (Roman province)
Populated places in Libya